Events in the year 1975 in Turkey.

Parliament
 15th Parliament of Turkey

Incumbents
President – Fahri Korutürk
Prime Minister –
 until 31 March: Sadi Irmak 
 starting 31 March: Süleyman Demirel 
Leader of the opposition – Bülent Ecevit

Ruling party and the main opposition
Ruling party – Justice Party (AP) and coalition partners National Salvation Party (MSP), Republican Reliance Party (CGP), and Nationalist Movement Party (MHP) – (starting 31 March) – The government is sometimes called 1.MC
Main opposition – Republican People's Party (CHP) (26 January – 17 November 1974)

Cabinet
38th government of Turkey (until 31 March)  
39th government of Turkey, also called "First MC" (starting 31 March)

Events
 30 January – Turkish Airlines Flight 345 crashes in Marmara Sea due to airport infrastructure problems.
 6 February – Turkey suspends talks with United States.
 13 February – Federated State of Northern Cyprus proclaimed.
 22 March – Turkey participates in the Eurovision Song Contest for the first time. Turkish contestant Semiha Yankı receives only 3 points, placing last.
 31 March – Süleyman Demirel forms a coalition government.
 22 April – Bildergerg meeting in Çeşme, İzmir
 1 June – Fenerbahçe wins the championship.
 6 September – 1975 Lice earthquake 
 3 October – U.S. partially lifts its arms embargo on Turkey.
 22 October – Daniş Tunalıgil, Turkish ambassador to Austria was assassinated by Armenian terrorists.
 24 October – İsmail Erez, Turkish ambassador to France was assassinated by Armenian terrorists. 
 25 December – State visit of Alexei Kosygin.

Births
 27 May – Feryal Özel, astrophysicist 
 10 August – İlhan Mansız, football player
 2 September – Defne Joy Foster, actress

Deaths
7 July – Reşat Ekrem Koçu, historian (b. 1905)
12 July – Latife Uşaklıgil , Atatürk's wife (b. 1898)
22 September – Bedri Rahmi Eyüboğlu, painter and poet (b. 1911)
12 December – Nihal Atsız, nationalist writer (b. 1905)

Gallery

See also
Turkey in the Eurovision Song Contest 1975
1974-75 1.Lig
1975 in Turkish television
List of Turkish films of 1975

References

 
Years of the 20th century in Turkey
1975 in Europe
1975 in Asia
Turkey